Chicago Coalition Against War & Racism (CCAWR) was formed in September 2001 to protest the imminent United States invasion of Afghanistan. CCAWR gained a foothold in Chicago street politics and rose to prominence when it organized a rally at Federal Plaza the day after the U.S. invaded Iraq on March 20, 2003. During that protest, 15,000 Chicagoans marched and took over Lake Shore Drive in a direct action that led to national news on the major networks, and 900 arrests by the Chicago police. Since then, CCAWR has organized and collaborated on projects ranging from conferences, to street protests, to national mobilizations, to counter-recruitment against the military.

See also
 List of anti-war organizations

External links
Official site
The story of the March 2003 protest

Anti–Iraq War groups
Political advocacy groups in the United States
Organizations based in Chicago
Anti-racist organizations in the United States
Organizations established in 2001
Protest marches in Chicago
2001 establishments in Illinois